Pierced Arrow is a 2016 album by the Rides, a band consisting of Stephen Stills, Kenny Wayne Shepherd, and Barry Goldberg.

Track listing

Personnel 
The Rides
 Stephen Stills – vocals, guitars
 Kenny Wayne Shepherd – vocals, guitars
 Barry Goldberg – keyboards

Additional musicians
 Kevin McCormick – bass
 Chris Layton – drums
 Kim Wilson – harmonica
 Raven Johnson – backing vocals 
 Stephanie Sprull – backing vocals

Production 
 Barry Goldberg – producer 
 Kenny Wayne Shepherd – producer 
 Stephen Stills – producer, cover artwork, layout, illustration
 Kevin McCormick – producer 
 Ed Cherney – engineer, recording, mixing 
 Jeremy Miller – assistant engineer 
 Bernie Grundman – mastering at Bernie Grundman Mastering (Hollywood, California)
 Stu Fine – A&R
 David Alan Kogut – package art
 West Coast Customs – layout, illustration
 Eleanor Stills – photography 
 Kelly Muchoney Johnson – business management 
 Elliot Roberts – management (for Barry Goldberg and Stephen Stills)
 Kristin Forbes and Ken Shepherd – management (for Kenny Wayne Shepherd)

References

2016 albums
Blues rock albums by American artists